TheAll India Kurmi Kshatriya Mahasabha (AIKKM) is an organisation that was established in 1894 to promote the interests of the Kurmi community.

Origin 

The Kurmi agriculturist community had a reputation as hard-working but were considered to be a tribe rather than a caste by the authorities of the British Raj. They were at one time classified as a criminal tribe and had a reputation for being violent and ruthless in their attempts to dominate untouchable communities. Desiring recognition as a caste, the first Kurmi community association was formed in 1894 at Lucknow to protest against the recruitment policy that debarred them from entry to the police service. This was followed by an organisation in Awadh that sought to draw to attention of some caste which are originates from  kurmi caste or sub caste  such as the Patidars, Marathas, Kudumbars, Kapu Castes , Kunbis and kamma-Naidu, vokaalingaa,Khandayat — under the kshatriya of the Kurmi name. This body then campaigned for Kurmis to classify themselves as Kshatriya but there are valid proof to support this statement in the 1901 census and, according to Christophe Jaffrelot, this led to the formation of the All India Kurmi Kshatriya Mahasabha in 1910. Other sources agree with this general history, which reflected a wider trend among Indian communities for social and political recognition, but consider the AIKKM to have formed in 1894.

In the 1940s and after, following the independence of India, the position of the AIKKM as a focal point for the community changed. In common with many other caste associations, it had been concerned primarily with resolving disputes among members of the community and with maintaining cohesion but a new breed of educated, youthful Kurmi activists sought a more politicised agenda. They appealed to the upwardly-mobile landowning members of the community to support their goal of recognition for Chhattisgarh as an independent state within the Republic of India. Some of these people, who included Purushottam Kaushik, formed organisations such as the Nau Yuvak Sangh (1946), while Khubchand Bagel was elected as head of the AIKKM in 1948 but, like Kaushik, was primarily interested the Chhattisgarh issue.

See also
Bhumi Sena

References 

Organizations established in 1910
Social groups of India